Vasyl Ponikarov (26 August 1929 – 16 May 2014) was a Soviet and Ukrainian artist, member of the National Union of Artists of Ukraine (1971).

Biography 
Vasyl Ponikarov was born on 26 August 1929 in the village Dolynske of Ananiv Raion of Odesa Oblast (Ukraine). His childhood coincided with the years of the Second World War. After seven years of schooling, he left his native village. After the end of the war Vasyl continued his studies firstly in the A.S. Makarenko Tiraspol Pedagogical College (1947–1948), lately in the M.B. Grekov Odesa Art school (1949–1958).

Leonid Ovsiiovych Muchnyk while getting acquainted with the works of Vasyl advised him: "You should to paint in watercolor. As I think, it's yours".
Ponikarov was called up for military service after the first course in the Art school. He was doing his military service in Yevpatoria. The military base where Vasyl was in the service appreciated a talent of young artist by entrusting to his charge all visual agitation (leaflets, placards). His gift and high appreciation of his effort as an artist culminated in increase of a duration of military service. Vasyl Ponikarov served longer than needed – three and one half years instead of three years. After the demobilisation Vasyl continued his studies within the walls of the same Art school in Odesa .

Three years after graduation from the Art school Vasyl Ponikarov becomes a student of Moscow Polygraphic Institute (1961–1970). Over this years his pedagogues were Y.K. Burdzhelyan, B.A. Sholokhov, G.T. Goroshchenko. Background of Vasyl Ponikarov already consisted of art works that had been exposed in all of the USSR.

From 1980 onwards Vasyl Ponikarov painted on journeys on the ocean liner "Fedor Shalyapin", where he served as a staff artist. Like so, the paintings were made, those on which the artist pictured what he saw in Italy, France, Spain, Turkey, Egypt, and Germany.

Works 
Landscape painting and still life were genres Ponikarov gave preference to. He painted using the wet-on-wet technique in watercolor on the premoistened paper that deprived dabs of paint of hardness. The artist painted in transparent watercolor, he didn't combine watercolor with other techniques and precluded the use of white paint (titanium dioxide PW6 or zinc oxide PW4) to obtain white color. White color is unpainted paper.

Many of Ponikarov landscape paintings pictured Odesa and its environs since almost all his life was connected with this region. Examples of those works: «Arcadia» (1984), «In Odesa Courtyard» (1984), «Winter on the Big Fountain» (1986), «Odesa. Proletarian boulevard» (1986), «Ilyichyovsk. Lighthouse» (1986). However, Vasyl created a good many of his watercolor paintings on his journeys across Soviet republics and abroad: «Dombay» (1972), «Karelian pines» (1975), «Lake in Sedniv» (1980), «Caucasian birches» (1981), «Rozluch. Carpathians» (1983), «Holosiivo. Ponds» (1984), «Vylkovo» (1987). On journeys that served him as a source of new impressions artworks cycles like «Ancient monuments», «Channel Dnepr-Donbass», «Pushkin reserve», «In Gurzuf»  were painted. Cycles of art works painted abroad contain images of Paris, Rome, London, Prague, Barcelona, Budapest, Istanbul, Jerusalem and Cairo.

In landscape painting the artist was giving pride of place to generous gifts of the South of Ukraine – juicy, mature vegetables and fruits, vivid flowers. Watercolors of flowers united in series brought him great success. As a "King of flowers and emperor of sunflowers" a fine art expert from Alexandria M. Sheryf named Vasyl. Vasyl Andriiovych worked often and incessantly on floral compositions by moving up images to the frames of pictures, by approaching images as much as possible to spectators. He pictured flowers in contourless sketchy manner that makes possible to reproduce flowering, rustle, smell.

As a rule, Vasyl Ponikarov worked on location finishing a watercolor painting in one session. Often he turned to work without planning it in advance. For example, departing somewhere on his car, Vasyl could pull up in the middle of the flowering field and turn to paint. Vasyl Andriiovych by creating several sheets a day for a half of century of his creative activity pictured tens of thousands of artworks that dispersed around the world. Ponikarov in Iryna Tymokhova (a fine art expert) opinion is one of the most productive artists. In this regard on the pages of news paper "Vechernyaya Odessa" Iryna Tymokhova compared the artist with I.K. Aivazovsky.

Awards 
 1998 – Master of watercolor, diploma of the program "Gold Masters of Odesa", Odesa
 1998 – Grand prix of Montgermont watercolor salon, commune Montgermont, France
 2002 – Winner in nomination "Artist of the year" in the competition "National recognition", Odesa
 2005 – Participant of the Watercolor Fair of Belgium, certificate of participant, Namur, Belgium
 2005 – Honoured Artist of Ukraine, state title
 2007 – Laureate of the contest "Your names, Odesa!" in nomination "The best works of fine art (graphics)"
 2012 – Laureate of the contest "Diamond Duke", diploma of the laureate of the contest "Diamond Duke" named after De Richelieu in nomination "Painting, Graphics", project "Save and Protect", Odesa
 2014 – Participant of the exhibition "Light of harmony", diploma of participant, the exhibition which was held within the framework of the international project "World without borders", Moscow, Russia
 Participant of the exhibition "Marinists of Odesa –  dedicated to the day of Saint Nicholas", commendation, Odesa

Exhibitions

Personal exhibitions 

 1984 – Odesa
 1986 – Odesa
 1987 – Kyiv
 1999 – in the Museum of Western and Eastern Art, Odesa
 2002 – in the Odesa Art Museum
 2004 – in the gallery of the club "Windrose", Oberursel, Germany
 2005 – Oslo, Norway
 2006 – in the Art Salon of the Union of Artists, Odesa
 2009 – on the occasion of the eightieth anniversary of the artist, in the Museum of Western and Eastern Art, Odesa
 2010 – in the gallery "Sady Pobedy"(), Odesa
 2011 – in the Museum of Western and Eastern Art, Odesa

Exhibitions of works of Odesa artists 

 1969 – Szeged, Hungary
 1970 – Bulgaria
 1974 – Italy
 1974 – Exhibition "Odesa – Marseille", Italy
 1976 – Genoa, Italy
 1977 – Szeged, Hungary
 1977 – Bulgaria
 1977 – Baltimore, USA
 1980 – Szeged, Hungary
 1981 – Genoa, Italy
 1985 – Geneva, Switzerland
 1987 – Finland
 1990 – Genoa, Italy
 1991 – in the Soviet Fund of Culture, Moscow, Russia
 1992 – New-York, USA
 1992 – in the embassy of Japan, Moscow, Russia
 1993 – in "Russian center", Jerusalem, Israel
 1996 – Mexico

Exhibitions "Picturesque Ukraine"() 

 2002 – Ukrainian House, Kyiv
 2003 – National Art Museum of Ukraine, Kyiv
 2007 – National Art Museum of Ukraine, Kyiv

Others 

 1977 – Watercolor exhibition of Odesa artists, Bulgaria
 1982 – Exhibition "Contemporary art of Odesa", Genoa, Italy
 1997 – "Gold Masters of Odesa", Odesa Art Museum
 1997 – "Contemporary art of Ukraine", National Art Museum of Ukraine, Kyiv
 1998 – Montgermont watercolor salon, commune Montgermont, France
 1999 – Exhibition of private collections of watercolors, Paris, France
 2000 – Exhibition of marinists. Marine gallery, Odesa
 2001 – Tregastel International watercolor salon, commune Tregastel, France
 2005 – Watercolor Fair of Belgium, Namur, Belgium
 2009 – Exhibition-cultural program "Art-alphabet or Odesa's Montmartre", Odesa
 2009 – Exhibition-project "Play of Color and Shape", г. Steinbach, Germany
 2010 – Traveling exhibition "The Traveler" devoted to the day of the land Hesse, Oberursel, Germany
 2014 – Exhibition "Light of harmony", international project "World without borders", Moscow, Russia

Exhibitions after the death of the artist 

 2015 – Personal exhibition, International Forum Eurowoman 2015, in Tbilisi and in Batumi, Georgia
 2015 – On the occasion of celebration of the day of Odesa, art-project "Magnifique opéra", Odesa
 2015 – European forum of collectors, Kyiv
 2015 – Personal exhibition "Transparency of a flower"(), Art gallery of madam Palmgren, Lviv, Ukraine
 2016 – Personal exhibition in the gallery of World-Wide Club of Odessites, Odesa
 2016 – Personal exhibition, charitable auction, in the Museum of Western and Eastern Art, Odesa

Works of the artist in collections

In museums 

 Odesa Art Museum
 
 , Kyiv
 
 
 
 Ochakiv museum of marine art
 Sharhorod folk museum
 International watercolor museum, Fabriano, Italy

In public institutions 

 
 , Kyiv
 Kherson children's regional hospital
 Kyiv Scientific Research Institute of Otolaryngologyl
 
 
 Rivne Palace of Pioneers and Schoolchildren

In galleries and private collections 

 Workshop of Vasyl Ponikarov, Odesa
 Art collector Yves Mouden, Brest, France

Literature

References

External links 

 Page dedicaded to ukrainian honored artist Vasyl Ponikarov, his life and arts
 ArtImport, leading experts in political and revolution art :: Ponikarov, Vasily Andreevich (prices)
 Ponikarov Vasily. Producer center Boyko
 Auction House «Golden section»: Ponikarov Vasily

1929 births
2014 deaths
Artists from Odesa
Ukrainian painters
Ukrainian male painters
Ukrainian printmakers